In Greek mythology, the Epigoni are the progeny of the heroes who fought in the First Theban War.

Epigoni can also refer to:
 Epigoni (play), a lost play by Sophocles
 Epigoni (epic), a lost early Greek epic poem, sequel to the Thebaid
 Epigoni, the progeny of the Diadochi of Alexander the Great